Vladimir Borisovich Korenev (20 June 1940 – 2 January 2021) was a Soviet and Russian film and theatre actor and teacher, known for The Amphibian Man (1962). He was awarded People's Artist of Russia in 1998.

Early life and education
Korenev was born on 20 June 1940, in Sevastopol, in the family of Rear Admiral Boris Leonidovich Korenev. He lived in Izmail until the family moved to Tallinn, where he became interested in literature and theater. Classmate Larisa Luzhina led Vladimir to drama club, directed by Ivan Danilovich Rossomahin. The circle also engaged Vitali Konyayev, Igor Yasulovich and Lillian Malkina.

In 1957, he enrolled in the Russian Institute of Theatre Arts in the studio of People's Artist of the RSFSR Gregory Konskiy and People's Artist of the USSR Olga Androvskaya.

Career
Korenev became famous in the 1960s, when he played the lead role of Ichthyander in the film The Amphibian Man, and became known as a sex symbol in the Soviet Union.

In 1961, he joined the troupe of the Moscow Drama Theatre (Stanislavski and Nemirovich-Danchenko Theatre), where he was invited by Mikhail Yanshin, who led the theatre at the time.

At the 19th edition of the Sozvezdie International Film Festival in 2011, Korenev, who was at the time artistic director at the Institute for Humanitarian Education and still acting at the Moscow Drama Theatre K.S.Stanislavsky]], was chair of the festival.

By 2015, Koronev had become artistic director of the Faculty of Theatre Arts Abbot.

Honours
He was awarded People's Artist of Russia in 1998.

Death
In 2020, the actor tested positive for COVID-19 amid the COVID-19 pandemic in Russia. Korenev died from COVID-19 in Moscow on 2 January 2021.

Filmography
1962: Amphibian Man as Ichtyandr Salvator
1965: The Light of a Distant Star as Viktor,  Zavyalov's nephew
1965: Children of Don Quixote as Viktor Bondarenko
1971: Liberation (part 4) as Neustroyev
1973: Much Ado About Nothing as Don Juan
1973: The Great Battle as Stepan Neustroev
1976: Champion as Valentin Kareyev
1977: Rudin as Konstantin Pandayevskiy
1980: I, Actress as Roshchin-Insarov
1989: Criminal Talent (TV Movie) as Sergey Sergeevich Kurikin
1991: Unknown Pages of Life Scout as Willy Walecki
2004: Children of the Arbat (TV Series) as Yuri Sharok's father
2015: Orlova and Alexandrov (TV Series) as Vladimir Nemirovich-Danchenko

References

External links
 
 

1940 births
2021 deaths
Soviet male actors
Russian male actors
Russian Academy of Theatre Arts alumni
People's Artists of Russia
Honored Artists of the RSFSR
Deaths from the COVID-19 pandemic in Russia